Retention may refer to:

General 
 Recall (memory), in learning, the ability to recall facts and figures in memory
 Memory and retention in learning
 Selective retention
 Cultural retention
 Customer retention
 University student retention
 Employee retention, the ability to keep employees within an organization
 Forced retention
 Grade retention, in schools, keeping a student in the same grade for another year (that is, not promoting the student to the next higher grade with his/her classmates)
 Retention basin,
 Retention election, in the United States court system, a process whereby a judge is periodically subject to a vote in order to remain in the position of judge
 Retention rate
 Retention ratio, in company earnings
 Retention of vision, in magic
 Water retention (medicine), abnormal accumulation of fluid in the body
 Urinary retention, the lack or inability to urinate
 Variable retention, in land management and forestry conservation

Information and records
 Retention (news server), in Usenet, the time a news server holds a newsgroup posting before deleting it as no longer relevant
 Data retention, in law and computing
 Data retention (telecommunication)
 Retention period, of a document, in records management
 Retention of title clause, in law

Chemistry
 Retention agent, a process chemical
 CO₂ retention
 Retention of configuration, in chemical reactions
 ER retention, proteins retained in the endoplasmic reticulum after folding
 Retention factor

Maths
 Retention distance
 Retention uniformity

See also
 
 
 Water retention (disambiguation)
 Retainer (disambiguation)